Eklent Kaçi (born January 29, 1999), also known as Klenti Kaçi is an Albanian pool and snooker player. Kaçi won the 2021 WPA World Ten-ball Championship and reached the semi-finals of the 2017 WPA World Nine-ball Championship. He has been the top-ranked played in the world of 9-ball pool.

Career
Kaçi started playing pool at the age of eight. He has won the Albanian Snooker championships in addition to national pool championships, even though he never played snooker prior to his Federation asking him to join the event. Kaçi made his first European championship in 2013, for ten-ball, qualifying for the main knockout, and being eliminated in the round of 64. In 2017, Kaçi made the semi-finals of the 2017 WPA World Nine-ball Championship, losing 11–6 to Roland Garcia.

The following year, at 18 years of age, Kaçi won the Aramith Masters, and became world number one later that year. At the 2018 WPA World Nine-ball Championship, Kaçi (as world number 1), lost to 17-year-old Robbie Capito 11–10 in the last 32. Kaçi won two events on the Euro Tour, reaching Euro Tour number one in 2018. He won the 2018 Treviso Open, and the following season the 2019 Austria Open.

Career titles
 World Championships
 WPA World Ten-ball Championship (2021, 2023)
 Mosconi Cup (2020, 2021)
 American Straight Pool Championship (2018)
 Pro Billiard Series
 Austria Open (2021)
 World Pool Series
 Aramith Masters (2017)
 Predator Grand Finale (2017)
 European Pool Championship 
 Eight-Ball (2019)
 Euro Tour
 Treviso Open (2018)
 Austria Open (2019)
 Albanian Amateur Snooker Championship (2016, 2018, 2021)

References

External links
 Eklent Kaçi at AZBilliards

1999 births
Living people
Albanian pool players
WPA World Ten-ball Champions